Saïd Ferguène (born June 16, 1992 in Tizi Ouzou) is an Algerian football player. He currently plays for JS Kabylie in the Algerian Ligue Professionnelle 1.

Club career
Ferguène began his career in the youth ranks of his hometown club of JS Kabylie.
On June 8, 2011, Ferguène made his professional debut for JS Kabylie as a starter in a league match against MC Alger.

International career
Ferguène was a member of the Algerian Under-17 National Team at the 2009 FIFA U-17 World Cup in Nigeria. An unused substitute in the opener against Italy, he sprained his ankle prior to the second game against Uruguay and was forced to miss the rest of the competition.

References

External links
 
 DZFoot Profile

1992 births
Living people
Footballers from Tizi Ouzou
Algerian footballers
Algerian Ligue Professionnelle 1 players
JS Kabylie players
Algeria youth international footballers
Association football forwards
21st-century Algerian people